Club Atlético Villa Teresa, is a Uruguayan football and cycling team club based in Montevideo. It was founded in 1941.

History
In 2011 Villa Teresa achieved promotion from Segunda División Amateur (third level) and returned to the Professional Second Division of Uruguay.

Cycling
The club also stands out in cycling, and is one of the permanent animators on the Rutas de América and the Vuelta Ciclista of Uruguay.

Titles
 Segunda División Amateur de Uruguay (3): 1984, 1999, 2010–11
 Primera "D" (Uruguay) (1): 1975

Current squad

External links

Official site

Villa Teresa
Villa Teresa
Cycling teams based in Uruguay
Villa Teresa
1941 establishments in Uruguay
Cycling teams established in 1941